Turceşti may refer to several villages in Romania:

 Turceşti, a village in Săpata Commune, Argeș County
 Turceşti, a village in Mateești Commune, Vâlcea County